The Westmorland and Furness Cup  was a rugby union knock-out club competition first organised by the Westmorland and Furness Rugby Football Unions.  The original incarnation of the cup was believed to have been formed in the 1890s around the same time as the better known Cumberland Challenge Cup (now Cumbria Cup) but records of its history are scarce.  The modern version of the Westmorland and Furness Cup was first introduced during the 1964–65 season and was won by Windermere.  

Despite the formation of Cumbria and the Cumbria Rugby Union in 1974, the Westmorland and Furness Cup continued to be held on a fairly regular basis throughout the 1970s and 1980s.  In the 1990s the larger clubs in the region tended to field their 'A' sides, instead focusing on the more prestigious Cumbria Cup, and by the 21st century interest in the competition had started to wane and it was cancelled after the 2007–08 season.

Westmorland and Furness Cup winners

Number of wins
Kendal (10)
Windermere (9)
Upper Eden (4)
Kirkby Lonsdale (3)
Ambleside (1)
Furness 'A' (1)
Hawcoat Park 'A' (1)
Millom (1)

Notes

See also
 Cumbria Rugby Union
 Cumbria Cup
 Cumbria League Cup
 Cumbria Shield
 Cumbria Vase

References

External links
 Cumbria RU

Recurring sporting events established in 1964
1964 establishments in England
Rugby union cup competitions in England
Rugby union in Cumbria
2008 disestablishments in England
Recurring sporting events disestablished in 2008